Phillip Raymond Stephenson (born September 19, 1960) is a former Major League Baseball first baseman. He played all or parts of four seasons in the majors, from  until .

Amateur career 
While playing for the Shockers of Wichita State University under his older brother, Gene, Phil hit safely in what was then the longest hitting streak in Division I history, 47 straight games in 1981. His record was broken by Oklahoma State's Robin Ventura, who hit safely in 58 straight games in 1987. He was also the victim of one of the most famous plays in College World Series history - The Grand Illusion play by Miami in 1982.

Professional career

Playing 
Stephenson was originally drafted in the 3rd round of the 1983 Major League Baseball Draft by the Oakland Athletics. He was traded to the Chicago Cubs before the 1986 season, and made his major league debut with them in 1989. That September, he was traded to the San Diego Padres, and finished his major league career with them in 1992. He played two more seasons of minor league baseball in the Kansas City Royals and St. Louis Cardinals organizations before retiring.

Stephenson was a replacement player during the 1995 players strike, playing for the Cubs during spring training.

Managerial and coaching 
He was the head baseball coach for Dodge City Community College. He has now joined the on-air lineup at KGSO, a sports talk radio station in Wichita, hosting a show from 9 a.m. until 11 a.m.

Notes

Sources

1960 births
Living people
People from Guthrie, Oklahoma
Major League Baseball first basemen
Chicago Cubs players
San Diego Padres players
Modesto A's players
Albany A's players
Tacoma Tigers players
Midland Angels players
Pittsfield Cubs players
Iowa Cubs players
Dodge City Mustangs baseball coaches
Las Vegas Stars (baseball) players
Wichita Wranglers players
Omaha Royals players
Louisville Redbirds players
Minor league baseball managers
Baseball players from Oklahoma
Wichita State Shockers baseball players
National College Baseball Hall of Fame inductees
All-American college baseball players
Rojos del Águila de Veracruz players
American expatriate baseball players in Mexico
Alaska Goldpanners of Fairbanks players